Ypsolopha indecorella is a moth of the family Ypsolophidae. It is known from France.

The wingspan is about 21 mm.

References

External links
lepiforum.de

Ypsolophidae
Moths of Europe